Pseudojaminia is a genus of gastropods belonging to the family Enidae.

The species of this genus are found in South Europe and near Black Sea.

Species:
Pseudojaminia arctespira 
Pseudojaminia blanda 
Pseudojaminia microdon 
Pseudojaminia seductilis 
Pseudojaminia tetrodon  (synonym: Pseudochondrula tetrodon (Mortillet, 1853))

References

Enidae